Chlorodrepana is a genus of moths in the family Geometridae.

Species
 Chlorodrepana allevata Prout, 1915
 Chlorodrepana rothi Warren, 1899

References
 Chlorodrepana at Markku Savela's Lepidoptera and Some Other Life Forms
 Natural History Museum Lepidoptera genus database

Geometrinae